Amaury Keusters (born 1 October 1990) is a Belgian field hockey player who plays as a forward for Royal Herakles.

He was part of the Belgian selection that placed for the final at the 2017 European Championship in Amstelveen. After having played 96 matches for the national team since 2012, he announced his retirement from the national team in February 2019.

References

External links

1990 births
Living people
Belgian male field hockey players
Male field hockey forwards
Men's Belgian Hockey League players
Place of birth missing (living people)